Whiting is an unincorporated community in Mississippi County, in the U.S. state of Missouri.

Demographics

History
A post office called Whiting was established in 1889, and remained in operation until 1909. The community has the name of Justin R. Whiting, a businessperson in the local lumber industry.

References

Unincorporated communities in Mississippi County, Missouri
Unincorporated communities in Missouri